Christine Teunissen (born 6 September 1985) is a Dutch politician of the Party for the Animals (Partij voor de Dieren). Since 24 March 2014 she has been a member of the municipal council of The Hague, and since 9 June 2015 she has also been a member of the Senate. She was the youngest one of that Senate session.
In the senate elections of May 2019 she was reelected as a senate member.

From October 2018 to January 2019 she temporarily left the Senate to replace Marianne Thieme in the Tweede Kamer (House of Representatives). In November 2020 the party published the list of candidates for the elections in March 2021. On this list Christine Teunissen appears as the number two, immediately after the party leader Esther Ouwehand, which makes it likely that Teunissen will be elected as a member of the Tweede Kamer.

Teunissen studied history at Leiden University. From 2012 to 2014, she was press secretary to the Party for the Animals fraction in the House of Representatives.

References

External links 
  Senate biography

1985 births
Living people
21st-century Dutch politicians
21st-century Dutch women politicians
21st-century Dutch historians
Dutch women historians
Leiden University alumni
Members of the Senate (Netherlands)
Municipal councillors of The Hague
Party for the Animals politicians
People from Leidschendam
Press secretaries
20th-century Dutch women